A bidding-prayer ("to pray", cf. ) is the formula of prayer, or exhortation to prayer, said during worship in churches of the Anglican Communion.  It occurs during the liturgy of the word, following the sermon. Such formulae are found in the oldest of Divine Liturgy forms in the Greek church, such as the liturgy of Saint John Chrysostom, as well as in the Catholic liturgies of the early Gallican Rite, and pre-Reformation England.

The form varies, but the characteristic feature is that the minister tells the people what to pray for. For example, the form for the bidding-prayer in the 1662 Book of Common Prayer begins, "Let us pray for the whole state of Christ's Church militant here in earth" (although this is an adaption of the former Canon of the Catholic Mass). The bidding-prayer is an informal intercessory prayer, covering a wide variety of concerns such as the church, the state, the living and the dead, and public and private necessities. In England in the 16th century, it took the form of a direction to the people what to remember in telling their beads. , 'to offer' , 'to command'). A form of exhortation which preachers and ministers shall move the people to join with them in prayer is given in the 55th canon of the Church of England (1603).

The terms intercessory prayers and prayers of the people are also commonly used for bidding-prayers. In keeping with Anglican custom, these are still said according to one or more Prayer Book templates, but are generally designed in such a way that specific topical, seasonal, or cyclical petitions can be added.  On occasion, the person leading the prayers will still introduce each petition with the phrase, "I bid your prayers for..."
 
A bidding prayer is offered at the beginning of the Festival of Nine Lessons and Carols observed at King's College, Cambridge University, on Christmas Eve; this prayer, whose text has remained largely unaltered since the Festival's inception in 1918, has been heard annually in radio broadcasts of the Festival since the 1930s.

Lutheran church services also include bidding prayers, although they are typically called "prayers of intercession" or "prayers of the people".  Some Methodist churches also include bidding prayers.

See also
 Jesus Prayer
 Book of Common Prayer
 List of prayers
 Prayers of the faithful, the intercessory prayers used in Catholic liturgy

References

Further reading
 
 Episcopal church website
 A Festival of Nine Lessons and Carols, 2009 leaflet p. 10

Anglicanism
Christian prayer